Yaqui Pass is a mountain pass on  in San Diego County in the U.S. state of California.

History 
The Yaqui Pass Road  was built in 1934-35 to connect with the new state highway  through the Narrows. It was paved by the military during World War II -- the first paved road in the valley.
During World War II, Yaqui Pass was used by the Marines to get to Camp Ensign, near Clark Dry Lake. Yaqui Pass is named after the nearby Yaqui Well, referring to a Yaqui Indian of Sonora, Mexico, who lived with a local Kumeyaay woman near the well sometime prior to 1909.

Images

External Links 
 Yaqui Pass Primitive Campground Guide
 A paved road to the summit of Yaqui Pass in California

See also 
 List of mountain passes in California
 California county routes in zone S
 Anza-Borrego Desert State Park
 Borrego Springs, California

References 

Mountain passes of California
Anza-Borrego Desert State Park
Santa_Rosa_Mountains_(California)